The red-throated parakeet (Psittacara rubritorquis), also called red-throated conure, is a species of parrot in the family Psittacidae.  It is found in El Salvador, Guatemala, Honduras, and Nicaragua.  Its natural habitats are subtropical or tropical dry forests and subtropical or tropical moist montane forests.  Some taxonomists consider it to be a subspecies of the green parakeet.

References

red-throated parakeet
Birds of Honduras
Birds of El Salvador
red-throated parakeet
red-throated parakeet
Taxonomy articles created by Polbot